Romano Scott (born 4 January 1985 in Cape Town, Western Cape) is a South African football (soccer) midfielder and striker for Premier Soccer League club Engen Santos.

He hails from Mitchell's Plain on the Cape Flats.Married to Jill Scott and father to Emma Scott. 

His older brother Carlo Scott is also a soccer player.

External links
Player's profile at absapremiership.co.za

1985 births
South African soccer players
Living people
Sportspeople from Cape Town
Association football forwards
Association football midfielders
Cape Coloureds
Santos F.C. (South Africa) players